What's It Worth is an early American television series that aired on the CBS Television network from 21 May 1948 and into 1949. The series was later revived in 1952, before finally finishing its run on 11 October 1953.

The show was hosted by self-taught appraiser Sigmund Rothschild (1917-1991), who appraised antiques for celebrities. Rothschild also hosted a similar program called Trash or Treasure? (1952–53) on the DuMont Television Network.

As the series title suggests, the audience submitted items of art, and Rothschild would tell them how much they were worth.

See also
Antiques Roadshow (PBS series)
Trash or Treasure (DuMont series)

References

External links
What's It Worth? at IMDB

1948 American television series debuts
1949 American television series endings
1952 American television series debuts
1953 American television series endings
CBS original programming
Black-and-white American television shows